Rear Admiral Peter Kofi Faidoo is a Ghanaian naval personnel who served in the Ghana Navy. He served as the Chief of Naval Staff of the Ghana Navy . He was appointed to the position by President John Mahama on 15 January 2016 to 2018. Faidoo visited Western Naval Base Command in Sekondi in a 1-week tour addressing key issues involving a lack of adequate supplies for navy personnel stationed there. He held the appointment as Chief of the Naval Staff until his retirement on 21 December 2018.

References

Year of birth missing (living people)
Living people
Ghana Navy personnel
Ghanaian military personnel
Chiefs of Naval Staff (Ghana)